In mathematics, the Hasse invariant (or Hasse–Witt invariant) of a quadratic form Q over a field K takes values in the Brauer group Br(K).  The name "Hasse–Witt" comes from Helmut Hasse and Ernst Witt.

The quadratic form Q  may be taken as a diagonal form

Σ aixi2.

Its invariant is then defined as the product of the classes in the Brauer group of all the quaternion algebras

(ai, aj) for i < j.

This is independent of the diagonal form chosen to compute it.

It may also be viewed as the second Stiefel–Whitney class of Q.

Symbols
The invariant may be computed for a specific symbol φ  taking values in the group C2 = {±1}.

In the context of quadratic forms over a local field, the Hasse invariant may be defined using the Hilbert symbol, the unique symbol taking values in C2.  The invariants of a quadratic forms over a local field are precisely the dimension, discriminant and Hasse invariant.

For quadratic forms over a number field, there is a Hasse invariant ±1 for every finite place.  The invariants of a form over a number field are precisely the dimension, discriminant, all local Hasse invariants and the signatures coming from real embeddings.

See also 

 Hasse–Minkowski theorem

References

 
 
 
 
 

Quadratic forms